The 15th annual 2011 Webby Awards were held on June 13, 2011 in New York City. The show was hosted by Lisa Kudrow and was streamed live via Facebook, The Huffington Post and Funny or Die. The Webby for lifetime achievement was awarded to former Motorola executive, Martin Cooper.

Nominees and winners

(from http://www.webbyawards.com/winners/2011)

References
Winners and nominees are generally named according to the organization or website winning the award, although the recipient is, technically, the web design firm or internal department that created the winning site and in the case of corporate websites, the designer's client.  Web links are provided for informational purposes, both in the most recently available archive.org version before the awards ceremony and, where available, the current website.  Many older websites no longer exist, are redirected, or have been substantially redesigned.

External links
Official website

2011
2011 awards in the United States
2011 in New York City
June 2011 events in the United States
2011 in Internet culture